Corpus Christi is an American Christian metal band from Cincinnati, Ohio. The term "Corpus Christi" is Latin for "body of Christ," which fits the band's Christian lyrics. They are currently signed to a five-record contract on Victory Records. Corpus Christi has been featured on TVU's weekly countdown show, TMW.

History

The Darker Shades of White (2009-2010) 

Forgoing the option of a self-titled album, Corpus Christi entitled their debut album The Darker Shades of White and released it on Victory Records.  Hit songs and videos from this album include "Fight for Your King" and "Parade of Scars."  Halfway through the Scream The Prayer '09 tour, original drummer Justin Evans unexpectedly left the band and Aaron Eckermann, drummer from the Christian metal band A Plea For Purging, filled in for the rest of the tour. The band then found a replacement drummer, Peter Keres. Original vocalist Will Henry left the band and former Agraceful vocalist Chris Roetter filled in as the vocalist for the remaining shows on the tours.

A Feast for Crows (2010-2012) 

The band's second release, entitled A Feast for Crows, brought a new type of sound from the band. Guitarist and vocalist Jarrod Christman was the only remaining member from their first release The Darker Shades of White. On June 29, the band released the first single, called "Monuments", off of the new album. The album was released by Victory Records on July 6, 2010.

Upcoming third studio album (2012-present) 
In February 2012, vocalist Max O'Connell said the band was currently writing their newest album. On their Facebook page, the band said the new album should be out in either the Fall or Winter 2012. However, no album was released.

In December 2013, the band released a demo song entitled "The Glorious".  The song suggested a heavier, grittier sound for their forthcoming album.

In May 2016, the band released another demo song titled "Sons of a Dynasty", after three years of silence. The band is currently working on new material.

The band is playing its first show in two  years with Spirit and the Bride, Silence the Ocean and other local acts on September 9, 2016, with the band's former drummer from the A Feast for Crows album.

Band members 
Current
 Jarrod Christman - rhythm guitar, clean vocals (2002–present), lead guitar (2014-present)
 Max O'Connell - lead vocals (2009–present), bass (2009-2010)
 Steph Roat - bass (Glassworld) (2012–present)

Live
 Andy Poling - drums (2009-2012; live 2016) (Orca)

Former members
 Brian Cash - drums (2002-2007) (ex-Beneath The Sky)
 Justin Evans - drums (2007-2009) (Fall of Babylon)
 Chris Towning - bass (2002-2008) (ex-Suffocate Faster, Bury Your Dead, ex-Too Pure To Die, DevilDriver)
 Will Henry - lead vocals (2006-2009)
 Chris Roetter - lead vocals (ex-Agraceful, ex-Emarosa, Like Moths To Flames (2009)
 Jon Pauly - lead guitar (2002-2009)
 Phil Smith - bass (2008-2009)
 Tyler Jameson - drums (2012-2014)
 Brian Maier Jr. - lead vocals (2002-2006)
 Caleb Rhoads - bass (2009-2012)
 Derek Ayres - lead guitar (2009-2012) (Orca)
 Aaron Strickland - lead guitar (2012-2014)
 Peter Keres - drums (2009)
 Aaron Eckerman - drums (A Plea for Purging) (2009)

Timeline

Discography 

Studio albums

Music videos
 Fight For Your King (The Darker Shades Of White) -2009
 Monuments (A Feast For Crows) -2010

Studio EPs

Singles
"The Glorious" (2014)
"Sons of Dynasty" (2016)

References

External links 
 Official Facebook
 Corpus Christi on Victory Records
 Official Myspace
 Corpus Christi Interview on TMW
 Official Video: "Fight for Your King"

Musical groups established in 2006
Heavy metal musical groups from Ohio
Metalcore musical groups from Ohio
American Christian metal musical groups
Victory Records artists